Polaroid Song is a French short film directed by Alphonse Giorgi and Yann Tivrier in 2011. Completed in 2012, Polaroid Song was broadcast on French public national television channel France 2 in April and September 2012 and was competitively selected for several film festivals throughout the world.

Plot 
In 1991, Lise is 18. The Gulf War ends, USSR collapses, Nirvana gives birth in a pool and three girls create the rock band Periodink. Their first concert will be for Lise the time to get through the age of adolescence.

Cast 
 Audrey Giacomini: Lise
 Nolwenn Auguste: Flory
 Deila Vogur: Lauriane
 Hélène Sargue: Ivy
 Dominique Bettenfeld: Pascal Julliard
 Edouard Audouin: Daniel Gatien
 Bruno Sanches: Xavier

Festivals 
 2012 : NXNE North by Northeast Festival of Toronto - Canada
 2012 : Philadelphia QFest - USA
 2012 : Lisbon Gay & Lesbian Film Festival - Queer Lisboa - Portugal
 2012 : SouthSide Film Festival of Bethlehem, Pennsylvania - USA
 2012 : Festival Troyes Premières Marches - France
 2012 : Festival Partie(s) de Campagne - France
 2012 : Festival Etang d'Arts in Marseille - France
 2012 : Fête des Compositeurs de Musique de Films à Paris - France
 2012 : Towson University Queer Film Fest in Baltimore - USA
 2012 : Festival l'Ecran s'Ecrit of Allevard - France
 2012 : Hell's Half Mile Film & Music Festival, Bay City, Michigan - USA
 2012 : Birmingham SHOUT, Sidewalk Moving Picture Festival in Birmingham, Alabama - USA
 2012 : Brest European Short Film Festival - France
 2012 : Festival :fr:Off-Courts in Trouville - France
 2012 : :de:Interfilm Berlin Festival in Berlin - Germany
 2012 : Festival du cinéma LGBT Image+nation in Montreal - Canada
 2013  : Roze Filmdagen Amsterdam Gay & Lesbian Film Festival in Amsterdam - Netherlands
 2013 : MQFF, Melbourne Queer Film Festival in Melbourne - Australia
 2013 : :de:Regensburger Kurtzfilmwoche in Regensburg - Germany
 2013 : ÉCU The European Independent Film festival in Paris - France
 2013 : Festival de Films Courts En Betton in :fr:Betton - France
 2013 : Festival Cinéma Désir Désirs in Tours - France
 2013 : Kyiv International Queer Film Festival in Kyiv - Ukraine
 2013 : TLV Fest, Tel Aviv International LGBT Film Festival in Tel Aviv - Israel
 2013 : Inside Out LGBT Film Festival in Toronto - Canada
 2013 : Mix Milano LGBT Film Festival in Milan - Italy
 2013 : Gaze LGBT Film Festival in Dublin - Ireland
 2013 : Cheries-Cheris, Paris International LGBT Film Festival - France

External links 
 
 

2012 films
French short films
French LGBT-related films
LGBT-related short films
2012 short films
2010s French films